Mobilong Prison is an Australian low and medium security prison for men located at Murray Bridge, South Australia. It has a capacity of 472 prisoners, housed in cells and cottage style units. The centre provides education and vocational training, as well as drug and alcohol counselling. 

Opened in 1987 after the closure of Adelaide Jail. It is an open campus prison, the first of its kind when it was built.

References

External links
Mobilong Prison

1987 establishments in Australia
Prisons in South Australia